New York City Fire Department Ladder Company 3, also known as Ladder 3, is a fire company and one of two ladder companies in the New York City Fire Department's (FDNY) 6th Battalion, 1st Division. It is housed at 108 E. 13th St., along with Battalion Chief 6, and has firefighting stewardship over a several square block area of Manhattan’s East Village. The company was created on September 11, 1865, and is one of New York’s oldest ladder companies.

During the September 11 attacks, the company reported to the North Tower of the World Trade Center. As the time of the attacks coincided with the morning tour change, both tours remained on duty, and the company arrived at the World Trade Center carrying more men than usual. Captain Patrick J. Brown and his men were last known to be on the 35th floor of the tower before the North Tower collapsed. Ladder Company 3 received some of the heaviest casualties of any fire company in the FDNY.  

Ladder Company 3’s apparatus, a Seagrave rearmount ladder truck placed in service in 1994, shop number SL9413, was parked on West Street next to Six World Trade Center and damaged beyond repair by the collapse of the Twin Towers. It spent ten years housed at Hangar 17 at John F. Kennedy International Airport. 

In 2011, ten years after the September 11 attacks, the ladder truck was made part of the National September 11 Memorial & Museum. The flag-covered, 60,000-pound truck was lowered by crane 70 feet below ground and observed by firefighters, victims’ families and other bystanders, as the FDNY Emerald Society performed "Amazing Grace" on bagpipes as they would at the funeral of a fallen FDNY member. It is intended to represent the members it lost on September 11 as well as all FDNY casualties.

References

External links 
 Ladder 3: September 11 Heroes

Ladder Company 3